Spix's white-fronted capuchin (Cebus unicolor) is a species of gracile capuchin monkey.  It had previously been classified as a subspecies of the Humboldt's white-fronted capuchin (C. albifrons).  Following genetic studies by Boubli, et al, Mittermeier and Ryland elevated it to a full species.

Spix's white-fronted capuchin has a wide range within the upper Amazon Basin in Brazil and Peru. It also occurs in northern Bolivia.

References

Capuchin monkeys
Mammals of Bolivia
Mammals of Peru
Mammals of Brazil
Mammals described in 1823
Primates of South America
Taxa named by Johann Baptist von Spix